Jews settled in Transcarpathia as early as the 15th century.  Local rulers allowed Jewish citizens to own land and practice many trades that were precluded to them in other locations. Jews settled in the region over time and established communities that built great synagogues, schools, printing houses, businesses, and vineyards. By the end of the 19th century there were as many as 150,000 Jews living in the region.

Beginning of the 20th Century

The last antebellum census in Hungary was in 1910. The four counties of Hungary that covered the territory, now known as Carpathian Ruthenia, were Ung, Bereg, Ugocsa and Máramaros.

Ugocsa and Máramaros counties were split between Czechoslovakia and Romania in 1920 after the disintegration of the Austro-Hungarian Empire, which lost in WWI. Hungary annexed their northern parts from the short lived Ruthenian state of Carpatho-Ukraine in 1939, and their southern parts from Romania in 1940. The northern parts now belong to Ukraine as a successor state to the Soviet Union.

Ung and Bereg were part of Czechoslovakia after 1920, except a small part of Bereg that stayed with Hungary. Hungary annexed their lower or southern parts from Czechoslovakia in 1938, and their upper or northern parts from the Ruthenian state in 1939.

Czechoslovakia
In 1921, about 27% of the Jews of Subcarpathian Rus lived from agriculture, making it the highest percentage of Jewish peasantry in all of Europe. In the 1921 and 1930 censuses, 87 and 93 percent respectively of all Subcarpathian Jews considered themselves to be Jews by nationality. It was, therefore, the least assimilated, Yiddish-speaking group in Czechoslovakia.

Jewish-local relations on the eve of World War II 
Memoirs and historical studies provide much evidence that in the 19th and early 20th centuries Rusyn-Jewish relations were generally peaceful and harmonious. In 1939, census records showed that 80,000 Jews lived in the autonomous province of Ruthenia.

The attitude of some Ruthenians to their Jewish neighbors is vividly represented in the play by Oleksandr Dukhnovych (1803–1865), Virtue is More Important than Riches briefed here as well as in short-story triptych Golet v údolí by Ivan Olbracht. In contrast to other areas of Ukraine, Ruthenia never experienced chaotic riots and pogroms.

The Holocaust 

During World War II, once the legal government of Hungary was overthrown by the Germans, the "Final Solution" of the Holocaust was also extended to Carpathian Ruthenia. To be sure, the legal government of Hungary and its fascist elements had already played a prominent role in killing Jews even before this.

Beginning in 1939, draconian laws had been passed banning Jews from going to school or from operating their previous businesses. Then in the summer of 1941, Hungarian authorities deported about 18,000 Jews from Carpathian Ruthenia to the Galician region of Poland-Ukraine. This was done under the guise of expelling alien refugees, but in practice most of those expelled were from families that had lived in the region for the previous 50–100 years. Many who might have been able to prove their long-term residency were taken without being given the chance. Most of the deportees were immediately handed over to Nazi German Einsatzgruppen units at Kaminets Podolsk and machine-gunned over a three-day period in late 1941. A few thousand others were simply left to their own devices after being pushed across the border into Galicia, in the area near Kaminets Podolsk. The vast majority of this group subsequently perished over the next two years in ghettos and death camps with other Jewish residents of the region.

Those Jews fortunate enough to avoid the 1941 deportations faced further privations under Hungarian rule. Men of working age were conscripted into slave labor gangs in which a high proportion perished. The remnant were ultimately returned to their homes in time to suffer deportation to concentration camps under Nazi rule after 1944.

In April 1944, 17 main ghettos were set up in cities in Ruthenia. 144,000 Jews were rounded up and held there. Starting on May 15, 1944: 14,000 Jews were taken out of these sites to Auschwitz every day until the last deportation on June 7, 1944.

The following table shows the death trains originating from these four counties that went through Kassa (Košice). (Some Jewish males were on forced labor (munkaszolgálat); some trains did not pass through Kassa; and some Jews from the area were forced to board trains departing from neighboring counties):

By June 1944, nearly all the Jews from ghettos of Carpathian Ruthenia had been exterminated, together with other Hungarian Jews. Of more than 100,000 Jews from Carpathian Ruthenia, around 90,000 were murdered. Except for those who managed to flee, only a small number of Jews were saved by Rusyns who hid them.

Since the fall of Communism, archives have been opened to allow study of the facts about the implementation of the Final Solution in the province. The most discussed issue is whether, and to what extent, local collaborators helped the Nazis in performing the tasks and to what extent such collaboration was forced upon those collaborators by the threat—or actuality—of brutal violence against themselves.

Post World War II

The estimated number of surviving Jews from the area was 15,000–20,000 people. Most of them left Carpatho-Ruthenia before the new Soviet borders were sealed in the fall of 1945, so there were only 4,000 Jews left in 1948. At the time of the first post-World War II census in the Soviet Union, in 1959, the number of Jews in the Zakarpattia Oblast was 12,569 - most of which were immigrants from other parts of the Soviet Union.

Most Jews who remained in the region emigrated to the United States and Israel during the 1970s in the wake of the Jackson–Vanik amendment, while a few went to Hungary. The last Soviet census in 1989 found only 2,700 Jews living in the area.

Today some synagogues have survived. The following cities have synagogues that existed prior to World War II:
 Khust

See also
 History of the Jews in Belarus
 History of the Jews in Hungary
 History of the Jews in Russia and the Soviet Union
 History of the Jews in Ukraine
 Oberlander Jews
 History of the Jews in Slovakia
 History of the Jews in the Czech Republic
 List of Jews from Russia, Ukraine and Belarus

References

 Henry Abramson, Collective Memory and Collective Identity: Jews, Rusyns, and the Holocaust, Carpatho-Rusyn American, vol. 17 (1994), no. 3.
 Alexander Dukhnovich, Virtue Is More Important Than Riches (translated by Elaine Rusinko), East European Monographs, 1995, 85pp., .
 Mikhael Mitsel, "The Activity of "the Joint" in Mukachevo in 1944 - 1945 and the Soviet attitude toward It in 1953", Jews in Russia and Eastern Europe, 1(58)2007 .
 Ágnes Ságvári,
 Studies on the History of Hungarian Holocaust, Budapest, Napvilag, 2002. , 151pp. (in English)
 Tanulmanyok a magyarorszagi holokauszt törteneteböl, Budapest, Napvilag, 2002. , 132pp. (in Hungarian)

External links
 Dr. Agnes Sagvari, "The Holocaust in Carpatho-Ruthenia"  A historian analyzes the place of Carpathian Ruthenia in Hungarian irredentism, the scientific falsification of census records, the impact of the Hungarian administration, an archival review with full documentation.
 Carpatho-Rusyn Knowledge Base

Jews
Carpathian Ruthenia
Carpathian Ruthenia
Carpathian Ruthenia
Carpathian Ruthenia